Göte Gåård (23 November 1931 – 25 April 2016) was a Swedish sports shooter. He competed in the 50 metre running target event at the 1972 Summer Olympics.

References

External links
 

1931 births
2016 deaths
Swedish male sport shooters
Olympic shooters of Sweden
Shooters at the 1972 Summer Olympics
People from Grums Municipality
Sportspeople from Värmland County